Don Carlos Bernardo Fitz-James Stuart y Silva, 4th Duke of Liria and Jérica, 4th Duke of Berwick (25 March 1752 – 7 September 1787) was a Spanish nobleman. Born in Liria, Spain, he was the son of James (Jacobo) Fitz-James Stuart, 3rd Duke of Berwick, and his wife, María Teresa de Silva y Álvarez de Toledo (a sister of Fernando, 12th Duke of Alba).

On 9 October 1771 he married Princess Caroline of Stolberg-Gedern (10 February 1755 – 15 April 1828), sister of the Jacobite consort Louise of Stolberg-Gedern and sister-in-law to Charles Edward Stuart, called by Jacobites King Charles III.

Carlos Fitz-James Stuart inherited his father's titles in 1785. In 1787, he lost by court order the titles held from the house of Columbus, namely the Dukedom of la Vega, the Dukedom of Veragua, the Marquisate of Jamaica, the Admiralty of the Ocean Sea and the Admiralty of the Indies, in favour of Mariano Colón de Larreátegui, who became the legal holder of said titles.

The Duke served as a Gentleman of the Bedchamber to King Charles III of Spain.

The Duke of Liria and Jérica died in 1787 in Madrid, and was succeeded by his son Jacobo (as 5th Duke de Liria y Jérica and 5th Duke of Berwick).

Titles

Spanish
11th Duke of Veragua, Grandee of Spain
11th Duke of la Vega, Grandee of Spain
4th Duke of Liria and Jérica, Grandee of Spain
14th Marquess of la Mota
12th Marquess of Sarria
12th Marquess de la Jamaica
6th Marquess of Tarazona
5th Marquess of San Leonardo
14th Count of Monforte de Lemos, Grandee of Spain
12th Count of Monterrey, Grandee of Spain
15th Count of Lemos
11th Count of Gelves
8th Count of Ayala

Jacobite
4th Duke of Berwick
4th Earl of Tinmouth
4th Baron Bosworth

References

1752 births
1787 deaths
18th-century Spanish nobility
Dukes of Berwick
Dukes of Veragua
Grandees of Spain
Spanish people of Irish descent